Alexa Demie is an American actress and singer. She is best known for her role as Madeleine “Maddy” Perez on the HBO teen drama television series Euphoria. Demie made her feature film debut with a minor role in the comedy-drama Brigsby Bear (2017), before starring in the coming-of-age film Mid90s (2018) and the drama film Waves (2019). She has also appeared in numerous music videos.

Early life
Born in Los Angeles, California, Demie grew up in the neighborhood of Atwater Village. She was raised by her mother, Rose Mendez, a make-up artist whose family immigrated to Los Angeles from Mexico when she was an infant and who got pregnant with Demie at an "extremely young" age. Demie has said that she "didn't grow up with the best male figures in [her] life" or "much respect for men". She lived in an apartment across the street from a meth lab and next door to several meth addicts, with the Black Eyed Peas recording studio being around the corner from her. According to her, there was frequent fighting and yelling in her home growing up, and she ran away from home as a teenager in order to escape her toxic family environment. However, she has described her family as "very supportive" and "there for each other". From elementary to high school, Demie was bullied by her classmates, describing herself during that time as "quite a loner". She got involved with performing arts in high school during her senior year.

While in high school, she spent her spare time bedazzling sunglasses that she purchased from Downtown Los Angeles, which led to her creating Mainframe, a line of sunglasses that she began selling at a store on Melrose Avenue where her friend worked. The brand eventually became popular overseas, with Mainframe glasses being worn by G-Dragon, Jennifer Lopez, Nicki Minaj, and Amber Rose and appearing in Vogue Korea, though she soon stopped making them due to not being paid for her designs. Also in high school, she started writing songs and designed a costume for one of Minaj's first music videos. Demie had plans to become a fashion designer but after attending orientation for an art school in New York, she decided against it.

Career
Demie made her first onscreen appearance as a video vixen in Azealia Banks' 2013 music video for the song "ATM Jam". After appearing in a short film for a friend, she got the lead role in The Godmother, a scrapped biopic about Colombian drug lord Griselda Blanco, in 2015. Her professional acting career began with a role in the 2015 short film Miles, through which she found an agency to represent her. She went on to guest star on the television series Ray Donovan and Love, also guest starring on the second season of the drama television series The OA as Ingrid, a bilingual gamer. In 2016, she released her debut single, "Girl Like Me", and was featured on Pearl's single "Turnin' Tricks". She appeared in the music video for JMSN's 2017 song "Slide" and made her debut feature film appearance in the 2017 comedy-drama film Brigsby Bear, in which she played Merideth. In July 2018, she directed the music video for JMSN's song "Talk is Cheap" with Natalie Falt.

Demie gained attention with her supporting role in the 2018 film Mid90s, written and directed by Jonah Hill, as Esmee, the protagonist's love interest. A year after Demie unsuccessfully auditioned for Augustine Frizzell's 2018 film Never Goin' Back, Frizzell emailed her about an audition for the HBO drama series Euphoria, the pilot episode of which she was directing. Although Demie had planned to take a break from acting to pursue her music career, she was impressed by the script for the series and decided to audition for it. In 2019, she began starring on Euphoria as Maddy Perez, a popular teenage girl in an abusive, on-again, off-again relationship with football quarterback Nate Jacobs (Jacob Elordi). Demie was called the breakout star of Euphoria by critics.

Demie went on to star in the 2019 film Waves as Alexis, a party girl who is impregnated by her boyfriend, a popular but troubled high school wrestler played by Kelvin Harrison Jr. She watched videos about codependency and drew on her own experience with an emotionally abusive relationship between her and a high school boyfriend, which she described as "very codependent", as the basis for the film's relationship. She also appeared in the comedy-drama film Mainstream in 2020 as a game show audience member named Isabelle Roberts, and made a cameo in The Neighbourhood's video for their 2020 song "Stargazing". In Nineteen on Fire, a 2021 short film written and directed by Ryan Simpkins, Demie played a drug dealer. In September 2021, she released the single "Leopard Limo (Archive LL11)". 

After messaging with photographer Petra Collins in the summer of 2020, Demie and Collins created Fairy Tales, a collection of erotic short stories written with Collins and containing photos of Demie dressed as various mythical creatures taken by Collins, which was published by Rizzoli in November 2021. She is set to be a voice actor in the upcoming animated series Fables.

Personal life
In 2019, Demie legally changed her name.

Filmography

Film

Television

Awards and nominations

References

Notes

External links
 

Living people
Age controversies
21st-century American actresses
Actresses from Los Angeles
American actresses of Mexican descent
American film actresses
American television actresses
Hispanic and Latino American actresses
Year of birth missing (living people)